The 1950 Soviet football championship was the 18th seasons of competitive football in the Soviet Union and the 12th among teams of sports societies and factories. CDKA Moscow won the championship becoming the Soviet domestic champions for the fourth time and continuing the post-war feud against Dinamo.

The championship went through second rebranding and since 1950 the First Group was named as Class A and the Second Group was named as Class B.

The defending champions Dinamo lost eight games this season allowing their main rivals CDKA to retake the title.

Honours

Notes = Number in parentheses is the times that club has won that honour. * indicates new record for competition

Soviet Union football championship

Class A

Class B

Top goalscorers

Class A
Nikita Simonyan (Spartak Moscow) – 34 goals

References

External links
 1950 Soviet football championship. RSSSF